Abdul Hai Neamati is a politician in Afghanistan who served as the first Governor of Farah Province after the Taliban government was ousted in late 2001. He was an ally of Ismail Khan and a member of the Jamiat-e Islami party.

References

Living people
Governors of Farah Province
Jamiat-e Islami politicians
Year of birth missing (living people)